Hanli Hoefer is a Singaporean of German and Malay descent, Singapore-based VJ for MTV Asia. She started her career as a model at Ave Management and became the MTV VJ in 2013 to current.

References

Singaporean women television presenters
 Singaporean people of German descent
Peranakan people in Singapore
1992 births
Living people